This is a Bibliography of the Front de libération du Québec.

The Front de libération du Québec (FLQ) was a left-wing  Québécois nationalist and Marxist-Leninist paramilitary group in Quebec, Canada. It was active between 1963 and 1970, and was regarded as a terrorist organization for its violent methods of action.

In English

Militant writings 

  (translated by David Homel) online excerpt

  (translated by Ralph Wells)

  (translated by Joan Pinkham)

Works 

 

 

 

 

 

  (translated by Edward Baxter)

Criminology 

 

 Crelinsten, Ronald. Limits to criminal justice in the control of insurgent political violence. A case study of the October Crisis in 1970, doctoral thesis, École de criminologie de l'Université de Montréal, 1985
 Wainstein, Eleanor Sullivan. The Cross and Laporte kidnappings, Montreal, October 1970 : a report prepared by Department of State and Defense Advanced Research Projects Agency, Santa Monica, California, Rand Corporation, 1977

Reports, Legal 

 McDonald, David Cargill, Report of the Commission of Inquiry Concerning Certain Activities of the Royal Canadian Mounted Police, Ottawa, 1979-1981 (online)

Video 
 The October Crisis: Civil Liberties Suspended, in CBC Archives, Canadian Broadcasting Corporation

In French

FLQ documents 

 La Cognée, 66 issues, from October 1963 to April 1967
 L'Avant-Garde, 5 issues, 1966
 La Victoire, from November 1967 to Summer 1968
 Pierre Vallières. Stratégie révolutionnaire et rôle de l'avant-garde, February 1969
 Charles Gagnon and Pierre Vallières. Pour un front commun multinational de libération, February 1970
 Pierre Vallières. La stratégie de la lutte armée, September 1971
 Partisans du Québec libre, single issue, by the Mouvement de libération des travailleurs du Québec, October 1970
 Délégation extérieure du FLQ, 6 issues, from Autumn 1970 to Autumn 1971
 Vaincre, 6 issues, from February to December 1971
 Organisons-nous, from October 1971 to September 1972

Militant writings 

 Pierre Vallière. (1986) Les héritiers de Papineau. Itinéraire politique d'un «nègre blanc» (1960–1985), Montréal: Éditions Québec-Amérique
 Francis Simard. (1982) Pour en finir avec Octobre, Montréal: Éditions Stanké
 François Schirm. (1982) Personne ne voudra savoir ton nom, Montréal: Éditions Quinze
 Louise Lanctôt. (1981) Une sorcière comme les autres, Montréal: Éditions Québec-Amérique
 Jacques Lanctôt. (1979) Rupture de ban. Paroles d'exil et d'amour, Montréal: VLB éditeur 
 Gabriel Hudon. (1977) Ce n'était qu'un début ou La petite histoire des premiers pas du FLQ, Montréal: Éditions Parti Pris
 Pierre Vallière. (1977) L'Exécution de Pierre Laporte. Les dessous de l'opération, Montréal: Éditions Québec/Amérique, 223 pages
 Jacques Lanctôt. (1975) La seule voie de la révolution au Québec, unpublished
 Pierre Vallière. (1972) L'urgence de choisir, Montréal: Éditions Parti Pris
 Pierre Vallière. (1968) Nègres blancs d'Amérique, Montréal: Éditions Parti Pris

Works 

 Éric Bédard. (1998) Chronique d'une insurrection appréhendée. La Crise d'octobre et le milieu universitaire, Sillery: Septentrion (online excerpt)
 Normand Lester. (1998 ) Enquêtes sur les services secrets, Montréal: Éditions de l'Homme
 Léon Dion. (1998) La Révolution dérouté 1960-1976, Montréal: Boréal, 321 pages
 Louis Fournier. (1998) FLQ : Histoire d'un mouvement clandestin, Outremont: Lanctôt, 533 pages
 Bernard Dagenais. (1990) La crise d'octobre et les médias : le miroir à dix faces, Outremont: VLB éditeur, 217 p.
 Fernand Dumont. (1971) La Vigile du Quebec. Octobre 1970: l'impasse?, Outremont: Hurtubise HMH, 234 pages
 Marc Laurendeau. (1990) Les Québécois violents, Montréal: Éditions du Boréal
 Robert Comeau (dir) (1990) FLQ : un projet révolutionnaire. Lettres et écrits felquistes (1963–1982), Outremont: VLB, 275 pages
 Jean-François Cardin. (1990) Comprendre Octobre 1970. Le FLQ, la crise et le syndicalisme, Montréal: Méridien
 Germain Dion. (1985) Une Tornade de 60 jours: la crise d'octobre à la Chambre des communes, Hull, Éditions Asticou, 222 pages.
 De Vault, Carole (1982). The Informer: Confessions of an Ex-Terrorist, Toronto: Fleet Books, 282 p. [translated by William Johnson]
 Luc Gosselin and Georges Paradis. (1980) État et violence: le terrorisme politique, une méthode d'opposition et d'affrontement, analysis essay, unpublished
 Louis Fournier. (1978) La police secrète au Québec, Montréal: Éditions Québec-Amérique
 Jean Paré. (1977) Le temps des otages (Le Québec entre parenthèses) 1970-1976, Montréal: Éditions Quinze, 269 pages.
 Jean Provencher. (1974) La grande peur d'octobre 70, Montréal: Éditions de l'Aurore, 123 pages.
 Jacques Lacoursière. (1972) Alarme citoyens!, Montréal: Éditions La Presse 
 Gérard Pelletier. (1971) La crise d'octobre, Montréal: Éditions du jour, 268 pages.
 Ron Hoggart and Aubrey Goldon. (1971) Octobre 1970 un an après, Éditions Hurtubise-HMH (translation of Rumours of War)
 Dr Serge Mongeau. (1970) Kidnappé par la police, Montréal: Éditions du Jour
 Joseph Costisella. (1965) Peuple de la nuit. Histoire des Québécois, Éditions Chénier, 126 pages
 Claude Savoie. (1963) La véritable histoire du FLQ, Montréal: Éditions du Jour

Reports, Legal 

 Jean-François Duchaîne. Report on the Events of October 1970, Direction générale des publications gouvernementales, Québec, 1981. 256 p.
 Jean Keable. Rapport de la Commission d'enquête sur des opérations policières en territoire québécois, Direction des communications, Ministère de la justice, 1981, 451 pages

 Newspapers, journals 

 Michel Gourd. "Quand l’arbitraire policier s’impose au Canada", in Le Monde diplomatique, February 2005
 Pierre Duchesne. "René Lévesque a-t-il su, avant 1981, que son ministre Claude Morin collaborait avec la GRC? - L'histoire s'écrit lentement...", in Le Devoir, May 4, 2000
 Andrée Ferretti. "From London to Ottawa, State terrorism in the history of Quebec", in L'Action nationale, volume 90, Issue 8 (October 2000) pp. 67–79
 "Octobre 1970 : dix ans après", in Criminologie, Volume 13, Issue 2 (1980)

 Audio-Video 

 Guerre secrète contre l'indépendance du Québec, documentary series Missions secrètes, 5 episodes broadcast on September 18, 2001 at Canal D, produced by Sophie Deschênes of Sovimage, script by Gilles Desjardins (online)
 Francis Simard and Jean-Daniel Lafond. La liberté en colère'', video documentary, 1994
 Octobre 70 : le Québec en crise , dossier containing 8 clips in Les Archives de Radio-Canada , Société Radio-Canada
 L'espionnage au Canada décodé, dossier containing 10 clips in Les Archives de Radio-Canada , Société Radio-Canada
 Pierre Vallières retrouve la liberté , in Les Archives de Radio-Canada , Société Radio-Canada (broadcast on January 25, Format 30, 27 min 09 s)
 Médiateur de la crise d'Octobre , in Les Archives de Radio-Canada , Société Radio-Canada
 « La liberté en colère »  in Les Archives de Radio-Canada , Société Radio-Canada (broadcast on November 30, 1994, 3 min 06 s)
 Pour un Québec socialiste , in Les Archives de Radio-Canada , Société Radio-Canada (broadcast November 24, 1972, 15 min 05 s)
 FLQ : Ni messie, ni Robin des Bois , dans Les Archives de Radio-Canada , Société Radio-Canada (broadcast October 8, 1970, 11 min 27 s)

Notes

Front de liberation
Front de libération du Québec